Kara Farnandez Stoll (born November 1968) is a United States circuit judge of the United States Court of Appeals for the Federal Circuit.

Biography

Early life and education

Stoll received a Bachelor of Science in Electrical Engineering degree, in 1991, from Michigan State University. She worked as a patent examiner at the United States Patent and Trademark Office from 1991 to 1997. She received a Juris Doctor in 1997, from Georgetown University Law Center. From 1997 to 1998, she served as a law clerk to Judge Alvin Schall of the United States Court of Appeals for the Federal Circuit.

Legal career

From 1998 to 2015, she worked at the law firm of Finnegan, Henderson, Farabow, Garrett & Dunner and was a partner at that firm. Her practice focused on patent litigation, primarily in the consumer electronics, computers, software and medical device industries. She represented clients at both the trial and appellate levels and served as lead counsel on a number of cases before the United States Court of Appeals for the Federal Circuit. Among her prominent cases, she represented Akamai in en banc rehearing on issues of divided infringement in Akamai Technologies, Inc. v. Limelight Networks, Inc. (Fed. Cir.) and she successfully represented i4i in the largest ($290 million) patent verdict sustained on appeal in i4i Ltd. v. Microsoft (Fed. Cir.). In 2013, she was recognized as a Washington, D.C. "Super Lawyer" in Intellectual Property Litigation by the Super Lawyers Magazine.

She served as an adjunct professor at Howard University School of Law, from 2004 to 2008, and has served as a Distinguished Adjunct Professor at George Mason University Law School, from 2008 to 2015. From 2013 to 2015, she served as Co-Chair of the Rules Committee of the Federal Circuit Bar Association and served as Vice Chair of that committee, from 2012 to 2013.

Federal Circuit service

On November 12, 2014, President Barack Obama nominated Stoll to serve as a United States Circuit Judge of the United States Court of Appeals for the Federal Circuit, to the seat vacated by Judge Randall Rader, who retired on June 30, 2014.

On December 16, 2014 her nomination was returned to the President due to the sine die adjournment of the Senate. On January 7, 2015, President Obama renominated her to the same position. She received a hearing on her nomination on March 11, 2015. On April 23, 2015 her nomination was reported out of committee by a voice vote. On July 7, 2015 the Senate confirmed her by a 95–0 vote. She received her judicial commission on July 8, 2015. She took the oath of office on July 17, 2015.

Notable opinions
Her opinion in Advanced Steel Recovery v. X-Body Equipment, 808 F.3d 1313 (2015) is highly cited for elaborating on the doctrine of equivalents, to include requiring the infringing patented product to "perform in substantially the same way as the claimed invention."

She also wrote the Federal Circuit's opinion in the prominent case Secure Web Conference v. Microsoft, No. 2015-1321, 2016 WL 626492, in which patent infringement claims against Microsoft's Skype were dismissed.

See also
List of first women lawyers and judges in Washington D.C. (Federal District)
List of Hispanic/Latino American jurists

References

Sources

1968 births
Living people
21st-century American judges
George Mason University School of Law faculty
Georgetown University Law Center alumni
Hispanic and Latino American judges
Howard University School of Law faculty
Judges of the United States Court of Appeals for the Federal Circuit
Michigan State University alumni
Patent examiners
People from Wilmington, Delaware
United States court of appeals judges appointed by Barack Obama
Lawyers from Washington, D.C.
American women legal scholars
21st-century American women judges